T class may refer to:

 Mercedes-Benz T-Class, a van
 NZR T class, a locomotive
 Victorian Railways T class, a locomotive
 T-class submarine (disambiguation), several types of ships
 T-class destroyer, destroyers of the Royal Navy launched in 1942–1943
 T-Class shooting, a long range shooting sport administered by the International T-Class Confederation

See also
 Class T (disambiguation)
 T (disambiguation)
 T series (disambiguation)
 T-type (disambiguation)